Gabi Burgstaller (born 23 May 1963) is an Austrian politician, and the former governess (Landeshauptfrau) of the State of Salzburg.

Life
She was born in Penetzdorf/Niederthalheim near Schwanenstadt in Upper Austria. After matriculation at a high school in Gmunden and one year abroad in England, she studied law at the University of Salzburg. From 1987 until 1989, she worked as an assistant at the Institutes for Constitutional and Administrative Law, and Sociology of Law respectively at the same university. From 1989, Mrs. Burgstaller worked as a consumer consultant at the Salzburg Chamber of Labour. There, specializing in residential rights and tenancy law, she earned an excellent reputation acting on behalf of 25,000 investors defrauded by the WEB-IMMAG building trust company.

In 1994, she started her political career as a Member of the State Government, whereas she acted as chairperson of the Austrian Social Democratic Party (SPÖ) right from the beginning. On 27 April 1999, Burgstaller was elected State Councillor in Salzburg's State Government. In the Government Burgstaller was responsible for female concerns, construction, trade, consumerism, and transport.

On 31 March 2001, Burgstaller was elected as the first woman to head Salzburg's Social Democratic Party with an approval of 98% of delegates. On 25 April, she was appointed as first deputy governor of the State of Salzburg.  Her agendas included the purviews of communities, health and youth issues, and again female concerns and consumerism.

Following an election victory for the social democrats, Gabi Burgstaller became governor on 28 April 2004. She was Salzburg's first female governor, the second female governor in Austrian history (after Waltraud Klasnic), and the first post-World War II governor of Salzburg not from the ÖVP.

She won the 2009, Salzburg State Elections with a 39.4% of the votes, losing a 6.0% and two seats, from 17 to 15.

After a major financial scandal striking the administration of the Land Salzburg she sustained a historic loss in the elections on 5 May 2013. SPÖ lost 15,56% and Burgstaller resigned. She was succeeded as governor by Wilfried Haslauer (ÖVP).

References

External links

State of Salzburg - Governor Gabi Burgstaller

1963 births
Living people
People from Vöcklabruck District
Austrian socialist feminists
Social Democratic Party of Austria politicians
University of Salzburg alumni
Women governors of Austrian states
20th-century Austrian women politicians
20th-century Austrian politicians
21st-century Austrian women politicians
21st-century Austrian politicians
Governors of Salzburg (state)